David Kowah (born 6 August 1971) is a Sierra Leonean boxer. He competed in the men's light heavyweight event at the 1996 Summer Olympics.

References

1971 births
Living people
Sierra Leonean male boxers
Olympic boxers of Sierra Leone
Boxers at the 1996 Summer Olympics
Place of birth missing (living people)
Light-heavyweight boxers